Boulevard Alfonso Valdés Cobián (Alfonso Valdés Cobián Boulevard) is the main entrance to Mayagüez from the North. It corresponds with former Post Street, north of the Yagüez River section.

The Alfonso Valdés Cobián Boulevard starts in a park at the front of the Vita Gate of the University of Puerto Rico at Mayagüez (the main entrance to UPRM). At beginning faces an intersection with Eugenio María de Hostos Avenue (PR-2) and Luis Lloréns Torres Avenue near the Escuela Vocacional Dr. Pedro Perea Fajardo (vocational high school).

It passes aside the Mayagüez Town Center (a shopping center), the "Radamés Peña" store, some college student's lodgings, the Cervecería India, the Casilla del Caminero and the old athletic field of the University of Puerto Rico at Mayagüez, ending at UPRM's Barcelona Gate junction with the Pedro Albizu Campos Avenue and the Ramón Emeterio Betances Street.

It was named since 1997 after Alfonso Valdés Cobián, an industrialist, banker, sportsman and politician.

See also

 List of highways in Puerto Rico

References

Streets in Mayagüez, Puerto Rico